Vacations in the Other World or Vacaciones en el otro mundo is a 1942 Argentine film directed by Mario Soffici. The film, a seriocomedy, explores the gap between the high-pressure world of business and the ambience of domestic living.

Cast
Elisa Galvé
José Olarra
Oscar Valicelli
Enrique García Satur
Enrique Chaico
Lea Conti
Julio Renato
Semillita
Elvira Quiroga

External links
 

1942 films
1940s Spanish-language films
Argentine black-and-white films
Films directed by Mario Soffici
Argentine comedy-drama films
1942 comedy-drama films
1940s Argentine films